Cotulla Independent School District is a public school district based in Cotulla, Texas, USA.

In addition to Cotulla, the district serves most of La Salle County, including the city of Encinal and the community of Fowlerton.

In 2009, the school district was rated "academically acceptable" by the Texas Education Agency.

Lyndon B. Johnson was principal of Cotulla's Wellhausen school (September 1928–May 1929), for $125/month.  Later, he was the 36th president of the United States.

Schools

Cotulla High School (grades 9-12)
Frank Newman Middle School (grades 6-8)
Ramirez-Burks Elementary School (prekindergarten-grade 5)
Encinal Elementary School (prekindergarten-grade 5)
Cotulla Alternative Campus

References

External links
 

School districts in La Salle County, Texas